The Electoral Commission of Jamaica (ECJ) is the independent statutory agency of the Government of Jamaica responsible for organising, conducting and supervising elections, by-elections and referendums.

Objective of the Electoral Commission
The Electoral Commission (Interim) Act (2006) defines the objective of the Electoral Commission as:

Functions of the Electoral Commission
The functions of the Electoral Commission are defined by law and in summary are 
 Establish  policies for governing the registration of electors  
 Conduct general elections,  local  government  elections, by-elections or referendums 
 Compile and maintain the register of eligible electors 
 Verify the identity of  eligible electors  
 Approve political parties eligible to receive state funding  
 administer electoral funding and financial disclosure requirements  
 monitor election expenditure by candidates or their official agents  
 review the number of constituencies and boundaries 
 determine polling divisions within constituencies

History

Formation of the Electoral Commission

In October 2006, the House of Representatives and the Senate passed the Electoral Commission (Interim) Act 2006, which established the Electoral Commission of Jamaica (ECJ).  The Commission replaced the Electoral Advisory Committee (EAC) that had been established by the Representation  of  the  People  Act 1979

The day-to-day operations of the ECJ are carried out through the Electoral Office of Jamaica (EOJ) which is a public government agency established in 1943 to administer the holding of Parliamentary and Local Government Elections.

The holding of Parliamentary and Local Government  Elections and all activities pertinent to these elections are regulated by the Representation of People Act and the Local Governance Act.

Previous Electoral Advisory Committee
The Electoral Advisory Committee (EAC) was established in 1979, dissolved in 2006 and replaced by the Electoral Commission of Jamaica (ECJ). Errol Miller was the last Chairman of the EAC, from December 2000 to December 2006, and the first Chairman of the ECJ from December 2006 to December 2012.

Membership

Membership of the Electoral Commission is governed by the Electoral Commission (Interim) Act (2006). The Commission has nine members appointed by the Governor-General, as follows: 
 Four Nominated Commissioners, two nominated the Prime Minister and two nominated by the Leader of the Opposition
 Four Selected Commissioners jointly agreed upon by both the Prime Minister and the Leader of the Opposition.
 The eight Commissioners unanimously nominate the Director of Elections
 The Commissioners also nominate one their number to be Chairman of  the Commission

Selected Commissioners and the Director of Elections are appointed for a period of seven years, while Nominated Commissioners serve for four years.  The Director of Elections and the Selected Commissioners are disqualified by law to vote in any General or Local Government Elections or referendums.

List of Electoral Commissioners

Current Commissioners

Former commissioners

References

Jamaica
Elections in Jamaica
Ministries and agencies of the government of Jamaica
2006 establishments in Jamaica